The Emerald Tablet, also known as the Smaragdine Tablet or the Tabula Smaragdina (Latin, from the Arabic: , Lawḥ al-zumurrudh), is a compact and cryptic Hermetic text. It was highly regarded by Islamic and European alchemists as the foundation of their art. Though attributed to the legendary Hellenistic figure Hermes Trismegistus, the text of the Emerald Tablet first appears in a number of early medieval Arabic sources, the oldest of which dates to the late eighth or early ninth century. It was translated into Latin several times in the twelfth and thirteenth centuries. Numerous interpretations and commentaries followed.

Medieval and early modern alchemists associated the Emerald Tablet with the creation of the philosophers' stone and the artificial production of gold.

It has also been popular with nineteenth and twentieth century occultists and esotericists, among whom the expression "as above, so below" (a modern paraphrase of the second verse of the Tablet) has become an often cited motto.

Textual history

The tablet states its author as Hermes Trismegistus ("Hermes the Thrice-Greatest"), a legendary Hellenistic combination of the Greek god Hermes and the ancient Egyptian god Thoth. Like most other works attributed to Hermes Trismegistus, the Emerald Tablet is very hard to date with any precision, but generally belongs to the late antique period (between c. 200 and c. 800). The oldest known source of the text is the Sirr al-khalīqa wa-ṣanʿat al-ṭabīʿa (The Secret of Creation and the Art of Nature, also known as the Kitāb al-ʿilal or The Book of Causes), an encyclopedic work on natural philosophy falsely attributed to Apollonius of Tyana (c. 15–100, Arabic: Balīnūs or Balīnās). This book was compiled in Arabic in the late eighth or early ninth century, but it was most likely based on (much) older Greek and/or Syriac sources. In the frame story of the Sirr al-khalīqa, Balīnūs tells his readers that he discovered the text in a vault below a statue of Hermes in Tyana, and that, inside the vault, an old corpse on a golden throne held the emerald tablet.

Slightly different versions of the Emerald Tablet also appear in the Kitāb Usṭuqus al-uss al-thānī (The Second Book of the Element of the Foundation, c. 850–950) attributed to Jabir ibn Hayyan, in the longer version of the Sirr al-asrār (The Secret of Secrets, a tenth century compilation of earlier works that was falsely attributed to Aristotle), and in the Egyptian alchemist Ibn Umayl's (ca. 900 – 960) Kitāb al-māʾ al-waraqī wa-l-arḍ al-najmiyya (Book of the Silvery Water and the Starry Earth).

The Emerald Tablet was first translated into Latin in the twelfth century by Hugo of Santalla as part of his translation of the Sirr al-khalīqa. It was again translated into Latin along with the thirteenth century translation of the longer version of the pseudo-Aristotelian Sirr al-asrār (Latin: Secretum secretorum). However, the Latin translation which formed the basis for all later versions (the so-called 'vulgate') was originally part of an anonymous compilation of commentaries on the Emerald Tablet variously called Liber Hermetis de alchimia, Liber dabessi, or Liber rebis (twelfth or thirteenth century).

Arabic versions of the tablet text

From pseudo-Apollonius of Tyana's Sirr al-khalīqa (c. 750–850)

The earliest known version of the Emerald Tablet on which all later versions were based is found in pseudo-Apollonius of Tyana's Sirr al-khalīqa wa-ṣanʿat al-ṭabīʿa (The Secret of Creation and the Art of Nature).

From the Kitāb Usṭuqus al-uss al-thānī (ca. 850–950) attributed to Jabir ibn Hayyan

A somewhat shorter version is quoted in the Kitāb Usṭuqus al-uss al-thānī (The Second Book of the Element of the Foundation) attributed to Jabir ibn Hayyan. Lines 6, 8, and 11–15 from the version in the Sirr al-khalīqa are missing, while other parts seem to be corrupt. Jabir's version was translated by Eric J. Holmyard:

From the pseudo-Aristotelian Sirr al-asrār (tenth century)

A still later version is found in the pseudo-Aristotelian Sirr al-asrār (Secret of Secrets, tenth century).

Medieval Latin versions of the tablet text

From the Latin translation of pseudo-Apollonius of Tyana's Sirr al-khalīqa (De secretis nature)

The tablet was first translated into Latin in the twelfth century by Hugo of Santalla as part of his translation of the Sirr al-khalīqa (The Secret of Creation, original Arabic above).

From the Latin translation of the pseudo-Aristotelian Sirr al-asrār (Secretum secretorum)

The tablet was also translated into Latin as part of the longer version of the pseudo-Aristotelian Sirr al-asrār (Latin: Secretum Secretorum, original Arabic above). It differs significantly both from the translation by Hugo of Santalla (see above) and the vulgate translation (see below).

Vulgate (from the Liber Hermetis de alchimia or Liber dabessi)

The most widely distributed Latin translation (the so-called 'vulgate') is found in an anonymous compilation of commentaries on the Emerald Tablet variously called Liber Hermetis de alchimia, Liber dabessi, or Liber rebis (twelfth or thirteenth century). Again, it differs significantly from the other two early Latin versions.

Early modern versions of the tablet text

Latin (Nuremberg, 1541)

Despite some small differences, the 16th century Nuremberg edition of the Latin text remains largely similar to the vulgate (see above). A translation by Isaac Newton is found among his alchemical papers that are currently housed in King's College Library, Cambridge University:

Influence

In its several Western recensions, the Tablet became a mainstay of medieval and Renaissance alchemy. Commentaries and/or translations were published by, among others, Trithemius, Roger Bacon, Michael Maier, Albertus Magnus, and Isaac Newton. The concise text was a popular summary of alchemical principles, wherein the secrets of the philosophers' stone were thought to have been described.

The fourteenth century alchemist Ortolanus (or Hortulanus) wrote a substantial exegesis on The Secret of Hermes, which was influential on the subsequent development of alchemy. Many manuscripts of this copy of the Emerald Tablet and the commentary of Ortolanus survive, dating at least as far back as the fifteenth century. Ortolanus, like Albertus Magnus before him saw the tablet as a cryptic recipe that described laboratory processes using deck names (or code words). This was the dominant view held by Europeans until the fifteenth century.

By the early sixteenth century, the writings of Johannes Trithemius (1462–1516) marked a shift away from a laboratory interpretation of the Emerald Tablet, to a metaphysical approach.  Trithemius equated Hermes' one thing with the monad of pythagorean philosophy and the anima mundi. This interpretation of the Hermetic text was adopted by alchemists such as John Dee, Heinrich Cornelius Agrippa, and Gerhard Dorn.

In popular culture
In the time travel television series Dark, the mysterious priest Noah has a large image of the Emerald Tablet tattooed on his back. The image, which is from Heinrich Khunrath’s Amphitheatre of Eternal Wisdom (1609), also appears on a metal door in the caves that are central to the plot. Several characters are shown looking at copies of the text. A line from the Latin version, "Sic mundus creatus est" (So was the world created), plays a prominent thematic role in the series and is the title of the sixth episode of the first season.

In 1974, Brazilian singer Jorge Ben Jor recorded a studio album under the name A Tábua de Esmeralda ("The Emerald Tablet"), quoting from the Tablet's text and from alchemy in general in several songs. The album has been defined as an exercise in "musical alchemy" and celebrated as Ben Jor's greatest musical achievement, blending together samba, jazz and rock rhythms.

See also
 As above, so below
 Hermetica
 Tablet (religious)

References

Further reading
 Forshaw, Peter (2006) (2006). "Alchemical Exegesis: Fractious Distillations of the Essence of Hermes", in L.M. Principe (ed.), Chymists and Chymistry: Studies in the History of Alchemy and Early Modern Chemistry. Sagamore Beach, MA: Science History Publications, 2007, 25-38
Holmyard, E.J. The Emerald Table, Nature, No. 2814, Vol. 112, October 6, 1923, pp 525–6.
Holmyard, E.J., Alchemy, Pelican, Harmondsworth, 1957. pp 95–8.
Needham, J., Science and Civilisation in China, vol. 5, part 4: Spagyrical discovery and invention: Apparatus, Theories and gifts. CUP, 1980.
Ruska, Julius. Tabula Smaragdina. Ein Beitrag zur Geschichte der hermetischen Literatur. Heidelberg, 1926. 
Ruska, Julius. Die Alchimie ar-Razi's. n.p., 1935.
Ruska, Julius. Quelques problemes de literature alchimiste. n.p., 1931.

M. Robinson. The History and Myths surrounding Johannes Hispalensis, in Bulletin of Hispanic Studies vol. 80, no. 4, October 2003, pp. 443–470, abstract.

External links

Various Translations of the Tablet
Various Pieces on the Emerald Tablet

Alchemical documents
Hermetica
Medieval texts
Arabic literature